The Herd is the self-titled debut album from the Australian hip hop band, The Herd.

The album reached number 2 in the AIR independent electronic charts and remained in the independent AIR charts top 10 for seven months.

The single, "Scallops" stayed in Triple J's Net 50 for 22 weeks.  The single had The Herd branded 'Falafel Rappers' (i.e. sensitive vegetarians) and accused of being a flavour of the month by hitching a ride on hip hop's jeep.

Track listing
 "Scallops" – 4:51
 "Lurque" – 4:05
 "Symbioses" – 3:20
 "Royal Jelly" – 3:56
 "Dase'n" – 5:15
 "Hello Boys" – 3:24
 "Hill Cats" – 5:51
 "Manufactured" – 3:23
 "Awaken" – 0:43
 "Toronto" – 2:47
 "X-Continental" – 4:10
 "Ones and Zeros" – 4:30
 "Too Late" – 4:25
 "Takin' Space" – 3:08
 "Gutter Rats" – 1:08
 "20 Leopards" – 3:36
 "Sutherland Pickup" – 3:52
 "Tricky Sleeves" – 3:44

References

The Herd (Australian band) albums
2001 debut albums